The Pilot was a pilot boat built in 1924 and designed by yacht designer William Starling Burgess. She was purchased by the Boston Pilots' Association to take the place of the pilot boat Louise that was withdrawn from service in 1924. The Pilot was in service for over fifty years before she was sold in 1976. She became the longest-serving pilot boat in American history.

Construction and service 

In 1924, the Boston pilot boat Pilot was designed by yacht designer William Starling Burgess to replace the pilot-boat Louise, which was withdrawn from pilot service on December 9, 1924. The Pilot was built for the Boston Pilots' Association at the J. F. James & Son shipyard (formerly known as Tarr & James) at Essex County, Massachusetts. She was a spoon-bowed schooner equipped with a twin-screw diesel engines. Her length was 121 ft. and was 98 ft at the water line with a 25 ft. beam. She had the "No. 1" painted across her mainsail.

On October 2, 1924, the Pilot was launched at the Essex shipyard at a cost of $52,000. She was a Knockabout type boat with 100-horsepower engines.

Pilot arrived in Boston on November 19, 1924, from Gloucester, Massachusetts with Captain Murdock McLean in command. McLean supervised her construction.

On December 9, 1924, the pilot boat Pilot left Lewis Wharf in Boston, on her trial trip past Boston Light. Captain William H. Lewis commanded her during the trial trip with fifty guests.

During World War II, the Pilot worked for the United States Coast Guard, moving troop transporters, freighters, and tankers. After the war she returned to the Boston Pilots' Associations until the early 1970s.

End of service

The Pilot was sold in 1976 to Norman D. Paulsen of California to serve as a research vessel. She was sold again in 1998 and her named changed to Highlander Sea. She was sold several times and in 2015 was purchased by Miles and Alex Pincus and converted into a maritime attraction at the Brooklyn Bridge Park.

Earlier Pilot (1917)

An earlier Maryland pilot boat Pilot was hit and sunk by the Merchants and Miners Line steamer Berkshire off New York Harbor on December 17, 1917. The pilot boat got tangled in submarine net trying to enter the inner harbor and was rammed by the steamer. There were no deaths.

See also
 List of Northeastern U. S. Pilot Boats

References

Schooners of the United States Navy
Patrol vessels of the United States Navy
Ships built in Boston
1924 ships
Pilot boats
Ships built in Essex, Massachusetts
Floating restaurants